Yehuda ben Meir, also known as Yehudah Leontin, was a German rabbi and Talmudic scholar of the late tenth and early eleventh century CE, who was from Mainz. 

Yehuda was the principal teacher of Gershom ben Judah, and his work was highly influential on the later writings of Rashi. Yehuda was surnamed, according to some sources, either "Léon", "Léonṭe", "Léonṭin", "Sire Léon", and "Sire Léonṭin", and was designated as "the grand" and "the gaon."

His grandson was also Rabbi Yehuda ben Meir of Mainz who was the author of Sefer ha-Dinim which contains an account of his travels and those of other Jews in Eastern Europe. In this work, Przemyśl and Kyiv are mentioned as trading sites along the Radhanite trade network.

References

Jewish explorers
10th-century German rabbis
11th-century German rabbis
10th-century births
11th-century deaths
Rabbis from Mainz
Kohanim writers of Rabbinic literature
10th-century German writers
11th-century German writers